Alejandro Manuel Cevallos Villaciencio (born August 3, 1967) is a retired Ecuadorian football goalkeeper that played most of his career for Emelec and played for the Ecuador national football team. He is now a goalkeeper coach.

Club career
He was champion of Ecuador with Emelec in 1993 and 1994.

Personal life
He is the older brother of José Francisco Cevallos, arguably Ecuador's best ever goalkeeper.

External links

1967 births
Living people
People from Santa Elena Province
Ecuadorian footballers
Ecuador international footballers
1997 Copa América players
C.S. Emelec footballers
C.D. El Nacional footballers
C.D. Cuenca footballers
Association football goalkeepers